United Nations Security Council Resolution 233, adopted on June 6, 1967, after an oral report by the Secretary-General regarding the outbreak of fighting and the situation in the Near East, the Council called upon the governments concerned to take all measures for an immediate cessation of all military activities in the area and requested that the Secretary-General keep the Council promptly and currently informed on the situation.

The resolution was adopted unanimously without debate.

See also
List of United Nations Security Council Resolutions 201 to 300 (1965–1971)
Six-Day War

References

External links
 
Text of the Resolution at undocs.org

 0233
Six-Day War
Israeli–Palestinian conflict and the United Nations
 0233
June 1967 events